King Gang was the 2nd king of Mahan confederacy. He reigned from 193 BCE to 189 BCE. His true name was Gang. He was succeeded by An of Samhan (An Wang).

References

See also 
 List of Korean monarchs
 History of Korea

Monarchs of the Mahan confederacy
2nd-century BC Korean people